Maciej Daniel Mas (born 15 May 2001) is a Polish professional footballer who plays as a striker for I liga club Sandecja Nowy Sącz.

Career

Mas started his career with Polish sixth division side UKS SMS Łódź.

In 2019, he was sent on loan to GKS Bełchatów in the Polish second division.

For the second half of the 2019-20 season, he was sent on loan to Italian Serie A club Cagliari Calcio.

In 2020, Mas returned to GKS Bełchatów.

On 1 August 2022, shortly after terminating his contract with Jagiellonia Białystok, he joined I liga side Sandecja Nowy Sącz on a two-year contract.

References

External links
 Maciej Mas at 90minut

2001 births
Sportspeople from Łódź
Living people
Polish footballers
Poland youth international footballers
Association football forwards
Expatriate footballers in Italy
Polish expatriate footballers
Polish expatriate sportspeople in Italy
GKS Bełchatów players
Jagiellonia Białystok players
Skra Częstochowa players
Sandecja Nowy Sącz players
I liga players